The 2015 Ironman World Championship was a long distance triathlon competition held on October 10, 2015 in Kailua-Kona, Hawaii and won by Jan Frodeno of Germany and Daniela Ryf of Switzerland. The race was the 39th edition of the Ironman World Championship, which has been held annually in Hawaii since 1978. The championship was organized by the World Triathlon Corporation (WTC) and awarded a total purse prize of $650,000.

Championship results

Men

Women

Qualification
The division of athletes was divided into professional, age group, physically challenged, and hand cycle divisions.

For entry into the 2015 World Championship race professional triathletes qualified for the championship through a point system. Points were earned by competing in WTC sanctioned Ironman and Ironman 70.3 events throughout the qualifying year. For the 2015 championship race that period was August 30, 2014 to August 23, 2015. The top 50 male and top 35 female pros in points at the end of the qualifying year qualify to race in Kona. An athlete's five highest scoring races were counted in the point totals. At least one Ironman race must have been completed and only three Ironman 70.3 races count towards an athlete's overall point total. Prior champions of a WTC Championship received an automatic entry for the Championship race for a period of five years after their last championship performance provided that they competed in at least one full-distance Ironman race during the qualifying year. Additionally, winners of the five regional Ironman championships received automatic qualification into the 2015 Ironman Championship. All automatic entries awarded did not count toward the number of available qualifying spots. The available prize money to professional triathletes for qualifying races ranges from $25,000 to $150,000, depending on the event.

Amateur athletes could qualify through a single performance at an Ironman event or at the Ironman 70.3 Kraichgau event. Slots were allocated to each amateur age group category, male and female, with the number of slots given out based on that category's proportional representation of the overall field. Each age group category was tentatively allocated one qualifying spot in each qualifying event. This qualifying year marked a large de-emphasis on using selected Ironman 70.3 series races as an avenue for amateur athletes to qualify for the Ironman World Championships. The change was made to accommodate for the increased number of qualifying slots created from the newly added full Ironman events.

Other means of entry into the championship race could also be obtained through a random allocation lottery, through Ironman's Legacy program, or through the Ironman's charitable eBay auction. Handcycle competitors could qualify at Ironman Cairns (one male/one female), Ironman 70.3 Luxembourg (one male/one female) and Ironman 70.3 Buffalo Springs Lake (two male/one female)

Illegal lottery
According to a sworn complaint filed with the U.S. District Court in Tampa, Florida, Ironman illegally charged athletes for a chance to win the opportunity to compete in the Ironman World Championship. According to Florida law, the state where the World Triathlon Corporation resides, it is illegal to set up and charge for a lottery. Because WTC charged a $50 fee to enter the lottery, instead of giving away the opportunity to win a slot at the championships, they were in violation of this law. Following the complaint WTC cooperated with the United States Attorneys office and the FBI's investigation of the matter and agreed to forfeit $2,761,910, the amount collected from the lottery since October 24, 2012.

Winners of the 2015 lottery were notified on March 17, 2015, prior to the announcement of the complaint. WTC stated that these winners would be unaffected by this decision and that their slots for the upcoming championship race would be honored.

Non-point races
Prior to the 2014 Ironman Boulder race, World Triathlon Corporation's CEO, Andrew Messick, announced a redistribution of prize money to help facilitate paying ten professionals deep at each race as well as awarding larger prize purses at select races across Ironman and Ironman 70.3. As part of this initiative, WTC eliminated points and prize purses for professional triathletes at 9 Ironman events and 11 Ironman 70.3 events in 2015, all occurring within North America. Those Ironman races with no points or prize purse offered include: Ironman Boulder, Louisville, Wisconsin, Maryland, Lake Tahoe, Florida, Muskoka, Los Cabos and Lake Placid. The majority of these listed events occur after the qualifying period has ended, August, and near the date of the annual Championship event in October. This would also mark the first time since 1985 that an Ironman race will not offer a prize purse. For the 2015 Ironman Championship qualifying period this affects Ironman Lake Placid and Ironman Boulder.

Qualifying Ironman races

*Ironman Lake Tahoe was canceled due to smoke from the King Fire.
XAmateur only competition.

Qualifying pro men

Qualifying pro women

References

External links
Ironman website
Professional Triathlete Qualifying Rules

Ironman World Championship
Sports competitions in Hawaii
Ironman
Ironman World Championship
Triathlon competitions in the United States
October 2015 sports events in Oceania